Jenny James may refer to:

 Jennifer James (born 1977), English actress
 Jenny James (orienteer), British orienteer
 Jenny James (born 1942), founder of the Atlantis commune